George Barnwell may refer to:
 George Barnwell, the lead character in the play The London Merchant by George Lillo
 George W. Barnwell (1888–1958), American electrical engineer